Valerie Goodwin-Colbert is a former basketball coach. She was the fifth head coach of the University of Oklahoma women's basketball program. While at Oklahoma, the program had a 32–51 record. During her tenure, the university dropped the women's basketball program but later reinstated it only to have Goodwin-Colbert resign the next day. Prior to coaching at Oklahoma, Goodwin-Colbert was the head women's basketball coach at Southwest Missouri State University.

References

Oklahoma Sooners women's basketball coaches
Living people
American women's basketball coaches
Missouri State Lady Bears basketball coaches
Year of birth missing (living people)